is a Japanese retired badminton player from Panasonic badminton team, and in 2013, started to play for the Hokuto Bank. Teamed-up with Koharu Yonemoto, they won the 2011 New Zealand and Austrian International tournament. They also won the Grand Prix title at the 2014 Russia Open tournament.

Achievements

East Asian Games 
Women's doubles

Asian Junior Championships 
Girls' doubles

BWF Grand Prix 
The BWF Grand Prix had two levels, the Grand Prix and Grand Prix Gold. It was a series of badminton tournaments sanctioned by the Badminton World Federation (BWF) and played between 2007 and 2017.

Women's doubles

  BWF Grand Prix Gold tournament
  BWF Grand Prix tournament

BWF International Challenge/Series 
Women's doubles

  BWF International Challenge tournament
  BWF International Series tournament

References 

Living people
1989 births
Sportspeople from Saitama Prefecture
Japanese female badminton players